There are multiple members of the American Bates family named Benjamin Edward Bates:

 Benjamin E. Bates I ( 1651 – after 1716), prominent merchant banker
 Benjamin E. Bates II (1716–1790), member of the Hell Fire Club
 Benjamin E. Bates III (1749–1818), banker 
 Benjamin E. Bates IV (1808–1878), industrialist and founder of Bates College